The 2011 Marist Red Foxes football team represented Marist College in the 2011 NCAA Division I FCS football season. The Red Foxes were led by 20th-year head coach Jim Parady and played their home games at Tenney Stadium at Leonidoff Field. They are a member of the Pioneer Football League. They finished the season 4–7, 3–5 in PFL play to finish in a tie for sixth place.

Schedule

References

Marist
Marist Red Foxes football seasons
Marist Red Foxes football